Verconia haliclona is a species of colourful sea slug, a dorid nudibranch, a shell-less marine gastropod mollusk in the family Chromodorididae.

Distribution 
This marine species is endemic to Australia and occurs at depths between 0–20 m off New South Wales, Queensland, South Australia, Tasmania, Victoria and Western Australia.

Description
The length of the body varies between 6 mm and 18 mm.

Ecology

References

 Burn, R. 1957. On some Opisthobranchia from Victoria. Journal of the Malacological Society of Australia 1(1): 11–29 
 Burn, R. 1966. On three new Chromodoridinae from Australia (Opisthobranchia: Nudibranchia). The Veliger 8: 191–197
 Burn, R. 2006. A checklist and bibliography of the Opisthobranchia (Mollusca: Gastropoda) of Victoria and the Bass Strait area, south-eastern Australia. Museum Victoria Science Report 10: 1-42

Chromodorididae
Gastropods of Australia
Gastropods described in 1957
Endemic fauna of Australia